831 Naval Air Squadron (831 NAS) was a Naval Air Squadron of the Royal Navy's Fleet Air Arm.
The squadron was reformed twice: firstly from 21 November 1955 - 10 December 1957 and then from 1 May 1958 - 26 August 1966.
 
The cartoon character Flook was adopted as a squadron mascot in the era following World War 2 and painted as nose art on aircraft.

References

800 series Fleet Air Arm squadrons
Military units and formations established in 1941
Military units and formations of the Royal Navy in World War II